The Electoral district of Ripponlea was an electoral district of the Victorian Legislative Assembly located in the Melbourne south-east suburb of Ripponlea, Victoria. It was created in 1955 and abolished in 1967.

Members

Tanner represented Caulfield 1967 to 1976

Election results

See also
 Parliaments of the Australian states and territories
 List of members of the Victorian Legislative Assembly

References

Former electoral districts of Victoria (Australia)
1955 establishments in Australia
1967 disestablishments in Australia